The Lane County Farmers Market is a farmers market in Eugene, Oregon, United States.  It provides fresh, locally grown produce, food products, flowers, and plants where shoppers buy directly from the producers.

History
The Lane County Farmers Market is related to the first public market in Lane County, which began in 1915.  The market location in downtown Eugene is where it began, though competition from large supermarkets and other conditions contributed to its closure in 1959.  Reopening in 1979, it has grown and now features nearly 160 growers and producers.
Membership is open to Oregon residents who grow or make their own products.

Present
The market features fresh Oregon-grown fruits, vegetables, herbs, flowers, plants, meat, seafood, eggs, baked goods, honey, and prepared foods.  Products vary throughout the season according to availability. The market runs Saturdays, February through December, and Tuesdays, May through October, in downtown Eugene.

See also
Eugene Saturday Market
Salem Saturday Market

External links
Official Website

Farmers' markets in the United States
Culture of Eugene, Oregon
Tourist attractions in Eugene, Oregon
1979 establishments in Oregon